William Herbert Dieterich (December 18, 1897 – July 23, 1964) was an attorney and jurist from Wisconsin. He was a justice of the Wisconsin Supreme Court from 1959 until his death in 1964.

Early life
He was born at his father's farm in Milwaukee County, Wisconsin. He enlisted in the Wisconsin National Guard in 1917 during World War I. He helped found the American Legion.

After the war was over, he went to college at the University of Wisconsin–Madison and the University of Montana and later to law school at Marquette University Law School. He passed his bar exam in 1923 to become a lawyer.

Career
He served as a trial attorney in Milwaukee and Washington Counties for 36 years. He lost several elections for Wisconsin's Attorney General and Wisconsin Supreme Court.

Dieterich was first elected to the Wisconsin Supreme Court in 1958, when he defeated Emmert L. Wingert in 1958 to become a Justice. In 1961, he convinced the Wisconsin Legislature to employ law clerks for the Supreme Court.

Personal life
He had a son William H. Dieterich III with his wife Kathryn Block. Dieterich died on July 23, 1964.

Electoral history

Wisconsin Attorney General (1948)

| colspan="6" style="text-align:center;background-color: #e9e9e9;"| Primary Election, September 21, 1948

| colspan="6" style="text-align:center;background-color: #e9e9e9;"| General Election, November 2, 1948

Wisconsin Supreme Court (1956, 1958)

| colspan="6" style="text-align:center;background-color: #e9e9e9;"| Primary Election, March 6, 1956

| colspan="6" style="text-align:center;background-color: #e9e9e9;"| General Election, April 3, 1956

| colspan="6" style="text-align:center;background-color: #e9e9e9;"| General Election, April 1, 1958

Notes

1897 births
1964 deaths
Justices of the Wisconsin Supreme Court
People from Milwaukee County, Wisconsin
University of Montana alumni
Marquette University Law School alumni
University of Wisconsin–Madison alumni
20th-century American judges
Military personnel from Wisconsin
Wisconsin National Guard personnel
United States Army personnel of World War I